Roselle is a borough located in Union County in the U.S. state of New Jersey, United States. As of the 2020 United States census, the borough's population was 22,695, an increase of 1,610 (+7.6%) from the 2010 census count of 21,085, which in turn reflected a decline of 189 (−0.9%) from the 21,274 counted in the 2000 census.

On January 19, 1883, the world's first electric lighting system employing overhead wires began service in Roselle. It had been built by Thomas Edison to demonstrate that an entire community could be illuminated by electricity. This success encouraged the installation of electric lighting in numerous other villages and cities. The First Presbyterian Church, located on the corner of West 5th Avenue and Chestnut Street, was the first church in the United States to be lit by electricity, and the second in the world after the City Temple church in London.

Roselle was incorporated on December 20, 1894, at the height of the Boroughitis phenomenon sweeping through New Jersey at the time, based on the results of a referendum held two days earlier, from portions of Linden. Roselle's name is derived from the Roselle Land Improvement Company, which was created in 1866 to lay out a community around the Mulford Station on the Central Railroad of New Jersey. The name "Roselle" is said to have been based on the company's founder, John Conklin Rose or from John Pierre Roselle, a friend of the railroad's president.

Geography
According to the United States Census Bureau, the borough had a total area of 2.65 square miles (6.86 km2), including 2.64 square miles (6.82 km2) of land and 0.01 square miles (0.03 km2) of water (0.49%).

Unincorporated communities, localities and place names located partially or completely within the borough include Aldene.

The borough is bordered by the Union County municipalities of Roselle Park to the north, Linden to the south and Cranford to the west and Elizabeth, along the edges of Warinanco Park, to the east. Morses Creek runs through the borough.

Demographics

2010 census

The Census Bureau's 2006–2010 American Community Survey showed that (in 2010 inflation-adjusted dollars) median household income was $58,041 (with a margin of error of +/− $3,948) and the median family income was $64,038 (+/− $4,495). Males had a median income of $40,163 (+/− $3,874) versus $36,210 (+/− $1,612) for females. The per capita income for the borough was $25,678 (+/− $1,130). About 7.5% of families and 8.2% of the population were below the poverty line, including 13.9% of those under age 18 and 4.6% of those age 65 or over.

2000 census
As of the 2000 United States census there were 21,274 people, 7,520 households, and 5,226 families residing in the borough. The population density was 8,048.8 people per square mile (3,111.3/km2). There were 7,870 housing units at an average density of 2,977.5 per square mile (1,151.0/km2). The racial makeup of the borough was 51.32% African American, 35.58% White, 0.31% Native American, 2.71% Asian, 0.07% Pacific Islander, 6.07% from other races, and 3.93% from two or more races. Hispanic or Latino of any race were 17.11% of the population.

8.0% of the population of Roselle (Creole: Wozel) was of Haitian ancestry. This was the third-highest such percentage in New Jersey and the 16th-highest of any municipality in the nation.

There were 7,520 households, out of which 32.2% had children under the age of 18 living with them, 45.3% were married couples living together, 18.8% had a female householder with no husband present, and 30.5% were non-families. 25.2% of all households were made up of individuals, and 9.9% had someone living alone who was 65 years of age or older. The average household size was 2.82 and the average family size was 3.41.

In the borough the population was spread out, with 25.5% under the age of 18, 9.4% from 18 to 24, 30.8% from 25 to 44, 22.2% from 45 to 64, and 12.0% who were 65 years of age or older. The median age was 35 years. For every 100 females, there were 87.9 males. For every 100 females age 18 and over, there were 82.8 males.

The median income for a household in the borough was $51,254, and the median income for a family was $58,841. Males had a median income of $37,604 versus $32,535 for females. The per capita income for the borough was $21,269. About 5.8% of families and 7.5% of the population were below the poverty line, including 8.5% of those under age 18 and 10.7% of those age 65 or over.

Economy
Portions of the borough are part of an Urban Enterprise Zone (UEZ), one of 32 zones covering 37 municipalities statewide. Roselle was selected in 2002 as one of a group of three zones added to participate in the program. In addition to other benefits to encourage employment and investment within the Zone, shoppers can take advantage of a reduced 3.3125% sales tax rate (half of the % rate charged statewide) at eligible merchants. Established in July 2002, the borough's Urban Enterprise Zone status expires in December 2023.

Arts and culture 
The Roselle House Music Festival is held each July in Warinanco Park, sponsored by the borough council as well as the Union County Board of County Commissioners and commercial brand sponsors.

Parks and recreation

Government

Local government
Roselle is governed under the Borough form of New Jersey municipal government, which is used in 218 municipalities (of the 564) statewide, making it the most common form of government in New Jersey. The governing body is comprised of the Mayor and the Borough Council, with all positions elected on a partisan basis as part of the November general election. The Mayor is elected directly by the voters to a four-year term of office. The Borough Council is comprised of six members elected to serve three-year terms on a staggered basis, with two seats coming up for election each year in a three-year cycle. Roselle is divided into five election districts, referred to as wards. One councilperson is elected from each of the five wards, and one councilperson is elected from the borough at-large. Roselle is one of only two boroughs statewide that use wards (the other is Roselle Park). The borough form of government used by Roselle is a "weak mayor / strong council" government in which council members act as the legislative body with the mayor presiding at meetings and voting only in the event of a tie. The mayor can veto ordinances subject to an override by a two-thirds majority vote of the council. The mayor makes committee and liaison assignments for council members, and most appointments are made by the mayor with the advice and consent of the council. A borough administrator, appointed by the Borough Council, oversees the day-to-day operations of the municipal government.

, the Mayor of the Borough of Roselle is Democrat Donald Shaw, elected to serve the unexpired term of office that expires on December 31, 2023, that had been held by Christine Danserau until she resigned from office. Reginald Atkins served as Mayor in the interim Members of the Roselle Borough Council are Council President Denise Wilkerson (Council-at-Large; D, 2022), Brandon Bernier (Ward 2; D, 2024), John Fortuna (Ward 5; D, 2024), Cynthia Johnson (Ward 3; D, 2023), Cindy Thomas (Ward 4; D, 2022) and Richard Villeda (Ward 1; D, 2023).

In January 2020, the Borough Council appointed Isabel Sousa to fill the First Ward seat expiring in December 2020 that had been held by Denise Wilkerson until she resigned from office to take a seat as the at-large councilmember.

Council President Kim Shaw was named to serve as acting mayor in March 2015, after Jamel Holley was named to fill a vacant seat in the New Jersey General Assembly. She served until Dansereau was sworn in on March 11, 2015, making her the first woman to serve as mayor in borough history.

In April 2015, the Borough Council, based on nominations submitted by the Democratic municipal committee, chose Samuel Bishop to fill the vacant seat in the 5th Ward of Roy Locke, while Reginald W. Atkins was chosen to fill the at-large seat vacated by Christine Dansereau when she was sworn in as mayor. Locke had resigned from office in February 2015, under pressure from then-mayor Jamal Holley who cited Locke's frequent absences from council meetings, which Locke attributed to conflicting work and personal responsibilities.

Federal, state and county representation
Roselle is located in the 10th Congressional District and is part of New Jersey's 20th state legislative district.

 

Union County is governed by a Board of County Commissioners, whose nine members are elected at-large to three-year terms of office on a staggered basis with three seats coming up for election each year, with an appointed County Manager overseeing the day-to-day operations of the county. At an annual reorganization meeting held in the beginning of January, the board selects a Chair and Vice Chair from among its members. , Union County's County Commissioners are 
Chair Rebecca Williams (D, Plainfield, term as commissioner and as chair ends December 31, 2022), 
Vice Chair Christopher Hudak (D, Linden, term as commissioner ends 2023; term as vice chair ends 2022),
James E. Baker Jr. (D, Rahway, 2024),
Angela R. Garretson (D, Hillside, 2023),
Sergio Granados (D, Elizabeth, 2022),
Bette Jane Kowalski (D, Cranford, 2022), 
Lourdes M. Leon (D, Elizabeth, 2023),
Alexander Mirabella (D, Fanwood, 2024) and 
Kimberly Palmieri-Mouded (D, Westfield, 2024).
Constitutional officers elected on a countywide basis are
County Clerk Joanne Rajoppi (D, Union Township, 2025),
Sheriff Peter Corvelli (D, Kenilworth, 2023) and
Surrogate Susan Dinardo (acting).
The County Manager is Edward Oatman.

Politics
As of March 2011, there were a total of 11,743 registered voters in Roselle, of which 7,127 (60.7% vs. 41.8% countywide) were registered as Democrats, 526 (4.5% vs. 15.3%) were registered as Republicans and 4,087 (34.8% vs. 42.9%) were registered as Unaffiliated. There were 3 voters registered as Libertarians or Greens. Among the borough's 2010 Census population, 55.7% (vs. 53.3% in Union County) were registered to vote, including 72.8% of those ages 18 and over (vs. 70.6% countywide).

In the 2012 presidential election, Democrat Barack Obama received 8,034 votes (88.8% vs. 66.0% countywide), ahead of Republican Mitt Romney with 875 votes (9.7% vs. 32.3%) and other candidates with 53 votes (0.6% vs. 0.8%), among the 9,043 ballots cast by the borough's 12,694 registered voters, for a turnout of 71.2% (vs. 68.8% in Union County). In the 2008 presidential election, Democrat Barack Obama received 8,055 votes (85.4% vs. 63.1% countywide), ahead of Republican John McCain with 1,262 votes (13.4% vs. 35.2%) and other candidates with 52 votes (0.6% vs. 0.9%), among the 9,428 ballots cast by the borough's 12,533 registered voters, for a turnout of 75.2% (vs. 74.7% in Union County). In the 2004 presidential election, Democrat John Kerry received 6,325 votes (79.4% vs. 58.3% countywide), ahead of Republican George W. Bush with 1,564 votes (19.6% vs. 40.3%) and other candidates with 40 votes (0.5% vs. 0.7%), among the 7,971 ballots cast by the borough's 11,609 registered voters, for a turnout of 68.7% (vs. 72.3% in the whole county).

In the 2013 gubernatorial election, Democrat Barbara Buono received 71.3% of the vote (2,882 cast), ahead of Republican Chris Christie with 27.6% (1,115 votes), and other candidates with 1.1% (44 votes), among the 4,283 ballots cast by the borough's 12,460 registered voters (242 ballots were spoiled), for a turnout of 34.4%. In the 2009 gubernatorial election, Democrat Jon Corzine received 3,816 ballots cast (77.3% vs. 50.6% countywide), ahead of Republican Chris Christie with 866 votes (17.5% vs. 41.7%), Independent Chris Daggett with 170 votes (3.4% vs. 5.9%) and other candidates with 35 votes (0.7% vs. 0.8%), among the 4,939 ballots cast by the borough's 12,148 registered voters, yielding a 40.7% turnout (vs. 46.5% in the county).

Education
Students are educated by the Roselle Public Schools, which serves students in pre-kindergarten through twelfth grade. As of the 2020–21 school year, the district, comprised of eight schools, had an enrollment of 2,897 students and 289.0 classroom teachers (on an FTE basis), for a student–teacher ratio of 10.0:1. Schools in the district (with 2020–21 enrollment data from the National Center for Education Statistics) are 
Kindergarten Success Academy with 184 students in Kindergarten, 
Harrison Elementary School with 268 students in grades 1–4, 
Dr. Charles C. Polk Elementary School with 295 students in grades 1–4, 
Washington Elementary School with 317 students in grades 1–4, 
Leonard V. Moore Middle School with 460 students in grades 5–6, 
Grace Wilday Junior High School with 503 students in grades 7–8 and 
Abraham Clark High School with 781 students in grades 9–12.

Roselle Catholic High School, a parochial high school run by the Marist Brothers, serves grades 9–12 under the supervision of the Roman Catholic Archdiocese of Newark.

St. Joseph the Carpenter School, which was founded in 1913, serves students in preschool through eighth grade, operating under the supervision of the Newark Archdiocese.

Transportation

Roads and highways

New Jersey Route 27 is the most significant highway in Roselle. It forms the borough's southeastern border with Linden.

Public transportation
NJ Transit provides bus service to the Port Authority Bus Terminal in New York City on the 112 and 115 routes, to Newark on the 59, 62 and 94 routes, with local service available on the 56 and 57.

Conrail's freight-only Lehigh Line passes through the community along the tracks of the former Lehigh Valley Railroad.  The town once shared a passenger station with Roselle Park on the mainline of the Central Railroad of New Jersey.  That line is abandoned.

The Staten Island Railway passed through the community before being dormant for years. It was reactivated by the Morristown & Erie Railway, but Morristown & Erie did not renew their option and their 10-year lease ceased as of May 15, 2012.

Notable people

People who were born in, residents of, or otherwise closely associated with Roselle include:

 Rabih Abdullah (born 1975), running back who played for the Tampa Bay Buccaneers and New England Patriots
 Reginald Atkins (born 1967), pastor and politician, who has represented the 20th Legislative District in the New Jersey General Assembly since 2022.
 Charles Augustus Briggs (1841–1913), Presbyterian theologian
 Abraham Clark (1725–1794), a founding father of the United States of America and a signer of the United States Declaration of Independence
 Neil M. Cohen (born 1951), represented the 20th Legislative District in the New Jersey General Assembly until being forced to suddenly resign after child pornography was discovered on his computer
 Greg Cook (1958–2005), basketball player
 Harold Dobbs (1918–1994), Republican politician and civic leader in San Francisco who founded Mel's Drive-In and served as president of the city's Board of Supervisors
 Jameel Dumas (born 1981), linebacker who played in NFL Europe
William Perry Fogg (1826–1909), author and adventurer
 Jerry Green (born 1939), politician, who has served in the New Jersey General Assembly since 1992, where he represents the 22nd Legislative District
 Rosey Grier (born 1932), former football player in the NFL for the Los Angeles Rams, a member of the original Fearsome Foursome
 Al Harrington (born 1980), professional basketball player who formerly played for the NBA's New York Knicks
 Jamel Holley (born 1979), politician who was chosen in 2015 to serve as a member of the New Jersey General Assembly representing the 20th Legislative District, after having served as mayor of Roselle since 2012
 Jesse Holley (born 1984), signed by the Cincinnati Bengals as an undrafted free agent in 2007, he was winner of the Spike TV reality show 4th and Long
 Gene-Ann Polk Horne (1926–2015), physician and hospital administrator, director of pediatric ambulatory care at Harlem Hospital and professor of pediatrics at Columbia University
 Phil Ivey (born 1976), professional poker player 
 Kendall James (born 1991), football cornerback who has played in the NFL for the Cleveland Browns
 Emil Milan (born 1922), mid-century designer craftsman who worked primarily in wood
 Barron Miles (born 1972), defensive back for the BC Lions in the Canadian Football League
 Rebecca Morse (born 1992), ice hockey defender, currently playing for the Metropolitan Riveters of the National Women's Hockey League
 Carole Dawn Reinhart (born 1941), trumpet player and professor in Vienna
 Charles August Sulzer (1879–1919), delegate to the United States House of Representatives from the Alaska Territory
 William H. Tunner (1906–1983), general officer in the United States Air Force
 Lucius Walker (1930–2010), Baptist minister best known for his opposition to the United States embargo against Cuba

See also
Identical Twins, Roselle, New Jersey, 1967, a photograph by Diane Arbus of the Wade twins

References

External links

 Roselle Borough website
 Roselle Public Library

 
1894 establishments in New Jersey
Borough form of New Jersey government
Boroughs in Union County, New Jersey
New Jersey Urban Enterprise Zones
Populated places established in 1894